Dil, Diya, Dehleez is a Pakistani television drama serial which is based on the novel of same name by the writer Riffat Siraj. It was  published by Khawateen Digest, an Urdu monthly journal. Starting in March 2006, it aired on Hum TV in Pakistan. It was directed by Yasir Nawaz.

It aired in UK on Prime TV in 2006.

Plot
The story is set against the backdrop of the feudal system and looks at its resultant class distinctions, besides the unraveling of a seemingly perfect marriage due to the connivance of Zaitoon Bano.

The initial episodes deal with the story of a young feudal heiress, Roshanay, and her budding love for one of her father's employees, Abdul Bari. Bari is a very strong and calm character who respects everyone in the Haveli. Besides romantic encounters between the two that suggest a budding affection, no direct evidence is given. Not surprisingly, most of the members of Roshi's family are in the dark about her love for Bari. A suicide attempt following her frustration at her 'distant relationship' with her father and brother, and the absence of any memories of her mother (who she is told is long deceased), compels her grandfather to arrange for her marriage at the earliest, with a fellow feudal heir. Roshanay is devastated and makes every possible attempt to curb these developments, even requesting her father to delay the impending engagement ceremony.

Roshi's deceased mother's youngest sister, Maheen, enters the scene. In sharp contrast to the picture painted of Roshi's mother (through intermittent flashbacks), Maheen is a highly qualified lawyer who has had a liberal upbringing in the city and has stayed unmarried due to her involvement with her education. With her wildly curly hair and funky salwar kameezes, Maheen is just the youthful presence Roshi needs. Her relationship with Roshi grows to the point that she accepts an offer of marriage with her father just to stay close to Roshni. It is suggested that Maheen has accepted this offer to unearth information about her sister. She feels that she was kept in the dark by her husband and his family. Her brief visit to the ancestral haveli where Roshi lives with her entire extended family, including much-too-brief meetings with Roshni and her brother, obvious lack of any reference to her deceased sister, and Roshi's unhappiness at being sent away soon after Maheen's arrival, leave her mystified. The fact that Maheen is the only person Roshi trusts enough to share her love for Bari with, attests to their close bond.

Unable to delay her marriage, Roshi runs away from the haveli on the eve of the wedding. In sheer frustration, she decides to go to the house of her uncle, who has been remarkably distant with everyone in the family, particularly Roshi and her father. It is to him that she begs for help to cancel her wedding. Her uncle, Taimoor, agrees to help and let her stay without informing any of the family until the matter is resolved. Soon after her arrival at her uncle's, Bari finds out about her and requests her return. His apparent indifference to her love for him results in a characteristic outburst that is seen by her uncle Taimoor. After much thought and a phone conversation with Maheen, Taimoor realizes that Roshi loves Bari and is, therefore, reluctant to marry Naim (the groom chosen by her grandfather). In one of the series' most surprising episodes, Taimoor gets Roshni married to Bari. The three agree to keep it a secret till the rest of the family agrees to the match. This episode also reveals a newer side of Bari. Unlike his usual stoic self, he indulges in friendly teasing and repeatedly expresses his love for Roshni.

The bulk of the series is devoted to revealing details of Nazneen's life after her wedding with Yawar, Roshni's father.

The story is narrated by a prisoner housed in the back of the haveli, a principal character in this part of the story. Her name is Zaitoon Bano. She has been introduced to Roshi as a prisoner who goes by the name of Mutraba. Another peripheral character who is shown to suffer due to the apparently selfish ways of the family is the driver's beautiful daughter, Jhoomer, who is married off to Roshni's mentally challenged cousin in a bid to cure him of his illness. Her father is paid a monthly sum to help with his expenses, and Jhoomer is given beautiful clothes and jewels, though she is not considered a member of the family, and treated with disdain and cruelty. Instead of silently suffering her fate, Jhoomer is shown to be feisty and puts up a fight against her oppressors. Initially, she refuses to care for her "husband" and has routine arguments with members of the family, including the patriarch. She is even confined to a desolate cottage in the wild in an effort to mend her ways. Bari is chosen to stay guard there, and it is during his stay that Jhoomer gets attracted to him. His apparent indifference to her beauty and her frustration at her own plight draw her towards him. He is shown to be completely indifferent and somewhat disdainful of her. Roshi, on the other hand, is initially very friendly towards Jhoomer and treats her as a sister-in-law, though her affection is tempered once she notices Jhoomer's obvious infatuation with Bari.
There were a few changes from Novel because of Television requirements. One side story of ballu and Arif was completely chopped out as it was too similar to Mutarba story secondly the drama showed that Yawar was also unfamiliar with the truth which made more sense as compared to Novel. Where Yawar knew everything and didn't repent.

Cast
 Faisal Shah as Abdul Baari
 Hiba Ali as Roshi/ Roshanay
 Moammar Rana as Taimoor Ali Khan
 Sara Chaudhry as Nazneen
 Farhan Ali Agha as Yawar Ali Khan
 Mustafa Qureshi as Khan/ Baba Saheb
 Angeline Malik as Maheen
 Javeria Abbasi as Zaitoon Bano/ Mutarba
 Tahira Wasti as Mrs. Khan/ Amman jee
 Samina Peerzada as Sheher Bano
 Zaheen Tahira as Khala Solah anay
 Beenish Chohan as Jhoomer
 Qavi Khan as Sheikh Saheb
 Sanam Iqbal as Alam Tab/ Bhabi Begum
 Ali Afzal as Ali
 Farah Nadeem as Sanam
 Afshan Qureshi as Saba
 Zarar
 Aisha

Lux Style Awards
 Best TV Play (Satellite)-Nominated
 Best TV Actor (Satellite)-Moammar Rana-Nominated

See also 
 Noorpur Ki Rani
 Aashti
 Mannchalay
 Doraha
 Manay Na Ye Dil
 Malaal

References

External links

Pakistani drama television series
Pakistani television series
Hum TV original programming
2006 Pakistani television series debuts
2006 Pakistani television series endings
Urdu-language television shows